Astylosternus occidentalis is a species of frog in the family Arthroleptidae.

Its natural habitats are secondary and primary forests. It is a secretive species that breeds in shallow streams. Habitat loss (deforestation) is a threat to this species.

References

occidentalis
Amphibians of West Africa
Taxa named by Hampton Wildman Parker
Amphibians described in 1931
Taxonomy articles created by Polbot